The Sheffield & Hallamshire County Cup was a county cup competition involving the professional sides within the Sheffield and Hallamshire County Football Association. It ran from 1920/21 to the mid-1990s, with several gaps between tournaments.

Eligible teams were - Barnsley, Doncaster Rovers, Rotherham County (until 1925), Rotherham United (from 1925), Sheffield United, Sheffield Wednesday.

Finals

Winners 
21 wins - Sheffield United (plus 2 shared titles)
11 wins - Sheffield Wednesday (plus 1 shared title)
10 wins - Barnsley (plus 1 shared title)
7 wins - Doncaster Rovers, Rotherham United
1 win - Rotherham County

See also
 Sheffield & Hallamshire Senior Cup
 Wharncliffe Charity Cup
 Sheffield & Hallamshire County Senior League

References

External links 
Official Site

Sport in Sheffield
County Cup competitions
Defunct football competitions in South Yorkshire